Short Homestead, also known as the James Baxter House, is a historic home and farm located near Georgetown, Sussex County, Delaware.  The earlier section is dated to the mid-18th century, and is a two-story, three bay, double-pile brick structure.  A two-story, two bay frame wing was built in the mid-19th century.  Both sections have gable roofs.  The house was once the center of a 500-acre plantation.  The house was "modernized" in the late-19th century.

The site was added to the National Register of Historic Places in 1982.

References

Houses on the National Register of Historic Places in Delaware
Houses in Georgetown, Delaware
National Register of Historic Places in Sussex County, Delaware